The white-browed crombec (Sylvietta leucophrys) is a species of African warbler, formerly placed in the family Sylviidae. The enigmatic Chapin's crombec might be a distinct species, or a subspecies Sylvietta leucophrys chapini of the present species.

The white-browed crombec is found in Burundi, Democratic Republic of the Congo, Kenya, Rwanda, Tanzania, and Uganda.

References

white-browed crombec
Birds of Sub-Saharan Africa
Birds of East Africa
white-browed crombec
Taxonomy articles created by Polbot